Evans Bay, located in Wellington Harbour, New Zealand, between the Miramar Peninsula and Hataitai, was the site of New Zealand's first patent slip and served as Wellington's international flying-boat terminal from 1938 until 1956. It is named after George Samuel Evans, an early Wellington settler.

Geography 
Evans Bay is a large U-shaped bay within Wellington Harbour. Within the bay are smaller features such as Balaena Bay, Hataitai Beach and Shelly Bay. Prior to the Haowhenua earthquake in about 1460 AD, Miramar was an island and Evans Bay would have been open to Lyall Bay. Today it is bounded by the Miramar peninsula to the east, the Rongotai isthmus to the south, and a hilly ridge forming part of Hataitai to the west.  Formerly the Waipapa Stream flowed from the valley in Hataitai into the head of Evans Bay near the bluff at Wellington Road, creating a large swampy delta. The shoreline of the bay in this area was known by Māori as Te Akau-tangi ("the crying shore", or "the murmuring shore"). An 1890 map names the beach at the head of the bay as Tangahakau Beach. Another Māori name suggested for Evans Bay is Kokotahi te Taniwha.Considerable reclamation has been undertaken at the southern end of the bay. Kilbirnie Park and Cobham Drive sit on reclaimed land.

Evans Bay as an unofficial Wellington suburb nestles at the western side of the bay between Hataitai, Kilbirnie and Rongotai. According to the 2018 census, the population of Evans Bay was 1122 people living in 435 dwellings. Evans Bay Intermediate School is to the south at the head of the bay.

History

Patent slip 

A heritage site near Greta Point commemorates the former Patent slip that operated in this location. The first slipway on the site was commissioned in May 1863 to enable maintenance of the hulls of small vessels. The Wellington Provincial Council was keen to encourage shipping trade by improving facilities in Wellington harbour, and began planning later in 1863 for the construction of a larger patent slip. A concession was granted for the supply, construction and operation of a patent slip on the site. Equipment for the new slip was delivered in 1865 and 1866, but construction was delayed for several years because of a contractual dispute concerning the suitability of the design for the ground conditions. The original suppliers lost a court case and withdrew from the project. The Wellington Patent Slip Company was formed to take over the assets and construction began in 1871. In March 1873, the Patent Slip was officially opened.

A second slipway was constructed at the site in 1922.  The original slip operated until 1969, and the second was closed on 31 July 1980.  Most equipment has been removed from the site, and a residential development now occupies some of the original land. However, the site has been listed as a Category 2 Historic Place, and the area is classified as a heritage zone by the Wellington City Council.

Union Steam Ship Company, Greta Point
During 1910 – 1911 the Union Steam Ship Company reclaimed land at Greta Point next to the Patent Slip and constructed a large complex of buildings, including a laundry, workshops, a sawmill and upholstery department. All of the company's laundry in New Zealand was handled by the site at Evans Bay. By 1981 all but one building had been demolished, and the former store became a bar and restaurant known as the Greta Point Tavern. In 2003 it was moved in pieces in 11 trips by barge to a site on Queens Wharf in the inner city. Not much remains of the original building except the exterior. As of 2022 the relocated building houses Foxglove bar and restaurant. The land at Greta Point was then used for a 91-unit townhouse development designed by Stuart Gardyne and Allan Wright of architecture+ and built during 2001-2002.

Power station 
In the early 1920s a coal-fired power station was built at Shag Point in Evans Bay (approximately near the roundabout at the intersection of Calabar Road and Cobham Drive). It began full operation in May 1924 and was shut down in 1968. Coke breeze ( a coal by-product) from the power station was used as infill for reclamation at the Evans Bay Yacht Club site. While the power station was unpopular due to its unsightliness and emissions, its outlet pipes discharged warm water into Evans Bay which was enjoyed by bathers.

Flying boats 
Evans Bay functioned as the preferred flying-boat alighting area in Wellington Harbour during the 1930s, and local officials promoted it through the decade as such. However a 1938 report concluded that although Evans Bay was the best site for flying boats in Wellington Harbour, it was subject to strong winds that would make a regular service unviable. Visits from Imperial Airways aircraft took place in 1938 as well as from Pan American types. In 1940 Tasman Empire Airways Limited (TEAL) flew one of their two Short Empire flying boats to Evans Bay with dignitaries who attended the nearby New Zealand Centennial Exhibition located at Rongotai.

Although RNZAF Short Sunderland and Consolidated Catalina flying-boat operations flew intermittently through the 1940s from their seaplane base at Shelly Bay located on the western side of the Miramar Peninsula, it was not until 1950 that TEAL (the forerunner to the national airline Air New Zealand), operated a permanent overseas service to Australia from Evans Bay.

A temporary terminal was provided by using roadside parking-garages along Evans Bay Parade at the sheltered western end of the bay next to the patent slip, until a more substantial terminal facility was constructed for TEAL on reclaimed land in 1951. TEAL installed a "Braby" pontoon dock to allow easier boarding and light maintenance of the Short Solent flying boats that TEAL used at the time. Evans Bay could become quite rough in unfavourable weather conditions and at least one Solent was damaged during alighting, needing substantial repairs.

Services to the Chatham Islands also operated from Evans Bay, using aircraft from TEAL and Ansett Airways as well as the RNZAF.

Nearby Rongotai airfield provided air-traffic control for the alighting area. As advances in aviation overtook the flying-boat concept, TEAL switched to landplane operations and the Evans Bay terminal closed in 1956. Also at the time, Rongotai airfield started undergoing total redevelopment into today's Wellington International Airport, which opened in 1959. An original concept involved developing a joint landbase and flying-boat airport, but this did not come to fruition.

Whale sighting 
Orca and dolphins visit Wellington Harbour fairly often, but whale sightings are much rarer. In July 2018 a juvenile male southern right whale was seen in Evans Bay. Crowds of people came to see the whale during the week it was in the bay, causing traffic jams. Wellington City Council postponed its annual Matariki public fireworks display after taking advice about the whale from the Department of Conservation. The mid-winter timing of the whale's visit led some people to nickname it 'Matariki'.

Demographics

Evans Bay had a population of 1,122 at the 2018 New Zealand census, an increase of 84 people (8.1%) since the 2013 census, and an increase of 192 people (20.6%) since the 2006 census. There were 432 households, comprising 558 males and 564 females, giving a sex ratio of 0.99 males per female. The median age was 34.4 years (compared with 37.4 years nationally), with 150 people (13.4%) aged under 15 years, 309 (27.5%) aged 15 to 29, 561 (50.0%) aged 30 to 64, and 99 (8.8%) aged 65 or older.

Ethnicities were 81.3% European/Pākehā, 10.7% Māori, 4.0% Pacific peoples, 11.0% Asian, and 5.6% other ethnicities. People may identify with more than one ethnicity.

The percentage of people born overseas was 32.9, compared with 27.1% nationally.

Although some people chose not to answer the census's question about religious affiliation, 58.3% had no religion, 29.1% were Christian, 0.5% had Māori religious beliefs, 2.4% were Hindu, 0.5% were Muslim, 1.1% were Buddhist and 2.9% had other religions.

Of those at least 15 years old, 486 (50.0%) people had a bachelor's or higher degree, and 51 (5.2%) people had no formal qualifications. The median income was $54,300, compared with $31,800 nationally. 372 people (38.3%) earned over $70,000 compared to 17.2% nationally. The employment status of those at least 15 was that 651 (67.0%) people were employed full-time, 120 (12.3%) were part-time, and 33 (3.4%) were unemployed.

Amenities and points of interest

Meridian Wind Sculpture Walk
The Wind Sculpture Walk consists of five wind-activated sculptures installed along Cobham Drive at the head of Evans Bay between 2001 and 2010. The sculptures and walkway were the result of a partnership between the Wellington Sculpture Trust, Wellington City Council and Meridian Energy. The area gets a lot of wind and the kinetic sculptures celebrate this. The five sculptures are Zephyrometer, Urban Forest, Akau Tangi, Tower of Light, and Pacific Grass.

Evans Bay Marina
Evans Bay Marina is situated at the southern end of Evans Bay. It has four piers with walk-on access to 141 berths for boats between 6 and 20m long.  The marina is managed by Wellington City Council.  Wellington Volunteer Coastguard operates from a base at the marina.

Evans Bay Yacht and Motor Boat Club
Evans Bay Yacht and Motor Boat Club has premises next to the marina on the western side of the bay, including a hall that can be hired by the public. The club was founded in 1919.

Balaena Bay and Hataitai Beach
Balaena Bay and Hataitai Beach, two small sheltered bays on the western side of Evans Bay, have been popular sunbathing and swimming locations for many years. Both areas have changing rooms and toilets, and Balaena Bay has a carpark. The Hataitai Bathing Club (now known as the Hataitai Amateur Swimming Club) was formed in 1908 and for many years ran swimming lessons and competitions from Hataitai Beach. The club built a private clubhouse in 1912 which was opened to the public around 1967 and then demolished in the 1970s, after which Wellington City Council built the current facilities. The club still offers children's swimming lessons, which now take place at the Aquadome at Wellington East Girls' College.

Boat sheds

Fifteen boatsheds are located on the western side of the bay between Hataitai Beach and the Evans Bay Yacht and Motor Boat club. A larger shed purpose-built for the Britannia Sea Scouts has a lean-to on each side of the main shed. The sheds sit above the water on wooden or concrete piles. They were built to store small boats and equipment, probably between the mid-1920s and the early 1930s. Another group of nine boatsheds were demolished to make way for the Evans Bay Marina around the 1950s. The boatsheds are privately owned, with tenure through a coastal permit for a licence to occupy issued by the Greater Wellington Regional Council.

Miramar Wharf and Burnham Wharf
Miramar Wharf and Burnham Wharf are situated on the Miramar peninsula at the eastern head of Evans Bay. Miramar Wharf was funded by the Crawford family and built in 1901. In 1909–1910 the wharf was altered and extended and at the same time a concrete seawall was built to the south and land reclaimed behind it. Tram tracks were laid from the wharf through the newly-created Miramar Cutting to the Miramar Gas Works so that coal could be unloaded more efficiently.  The wharf was further lengthened in 1921.  In November 2015 the wharf, then owned by Centreport, was closed due to deterioration of the piles.  Burnham Wharf was built for the British Imperial Oil Company and opened in 1927. As of 2021 the wharf is operated by Centreport. Aviation fuel for Wellington Airport arrives via Burnham Wharf.

'Wellington Blown Away' sign

In 2012 Wellington Airport Company erected a large sign spelling out "WELLINGTON", with the last few letters looking like they are blowing away in the wind, on a hill between the airport and the Cutting. The original plan was to spell out WELLYWOOD, but this met with massive public opposition. The sign can be seen from Cobham Drive and across Evans Bay.

Shelly Bay

Shelly Bay is a bay on the eastern side of Evans Bay. For many years it was used by the Defence Force and as of 2022 is the proposed site of a residential development.

References

Transport in Wellington
Geography of the Wellington Region
Suburbs of Wellington City
Airports in New Zealand
Bays of the Wellington Region
Wellington Harbour